The Vivo Y3 was launched in May 2019. The Vivo Y3s phone served as an even more budget friendly variant, reducing prices by cutting out the Ultra-wide camera, and launched much later, on October 26, 2020. The pricing for the Vivo Y3 was around €190 (¥1500), and the Vivo Y3s launched with a price of €150 (¥1170).

References 

Vivo smartphones
Mobile phones introduced in 2019
Mobile phones with multiple rear cameras
Android (operating system) devices